Viva la Diva may refer to:

 Viva la Diva, an adaptation and English translation by Kit Hesketh-Harvey of Donizetti's opera Le convenienze ed inconvenienze teatrali (also updated as Viva la Mamma), first performed at the Buxton International Festival in July 2022.
 Viva la Diva, Jelena Karleusa concert
 Viva la Diva (band)
 Viva la Diva (Darcey Bussell and Katherine Jenkins), a concert series by Darcey Bussell and Katherine Jenkins
 Viva la Diva - A Night at the Opera with Lesley Garrett, a concert by Lesley Garrett
 Viva la Diva, an album by Rocío Jurado
 Viva la Diva: the Best of, an album by Montserrat Caballé
 Viva la Diva, an album by Yuri
 Viva la Diva, a video by Ednita Nazario

See also 
 Viva La Vida